Raphaelynne Lee (born 24 October 1959) is a Hong Kong former backstroke and freestyle swimmer. She competed in two events at the 1976 Summer Olympics.

References

External links
 

1959 births
Living people
Hong Kong female backstroke swimmers
Hong Kong female freestyle swimmers
Olympic swimmers of Hong Kong
Swimmers at the 1976 Summer Olympics
Place of birth missing (living people)
Swimmers at the 1974 Asian Games
Asian Games competitors for Hong Kong